Sonam Lhundrup (1456–1531) was a great abbot of Mustang and the son of the second Mustang Dharma King, Agon Sangpo.

He wrote a four-volume Buddhist scripture.

References

1456 births
1531 deaths
History of Nepal
Tibetan Buddhist monks
15th-century Nepalese people
16th-century Nepalese people